This is a list of football clubs that compete within the leagues and divisions of the Welsh football league system as far down as Level 4, that is to say, down to the first division of the Welsh Regional Leagues. The relative levels of divisions can be compared on the Welsh football league system page.

List of Leagues and Divisions
Cymru Premier (Level 1)
Cymru North / Cymru South (Level 2)
Ardal Leagues NorthEast / NorthWest / SouthEast / SouthWest (Level 3)
Below these, you have the Regional Feeders (starting at Level 4):
Gwent County League Premier (there are also a Division One and Two at Levels 5 & 6)
Mid Wales Football League East / West
North East Wales Football League Premier (there is also a Championship at Level 5)
North Wales Coast East Football League Premier (there is also a Division One at Level 5)
North Wales Coast West Football League Premier (there is also a Division One at Level 5)
South Wales Alliance League Premier (there are also a Division One and Two at Levels 5 & 6)
West Wales Premier League

AlphabeticallyThe divisions are correct for the 2021–22 season.

Key



A

B

C

D

E

F

G

H

K

L

M

N

O

P

R

S

T

U

W

Y

External links
Football Club History Database

Football clubs in Wales
Wales
Football clubs in Wales